Adolfo is a Brazilian municipality located in the interior of the state of São Paulo in the microregion of São José do Rio Preto. The municipality was established in 1959.

References

Municipalities in São Paulo (state)
Populated places established in 1959
1959 establishments in Brazil